Meanwhile Back at the Whisky à Go Go was Johnny Rivers's fourth official album, and was his third recorded live at the Whisky a Go Go in Los Angeles. The album was on the Billboard charts for 21 weeks reaching #21 on August 30, 1965. Rivers' version of "Seventh Son" peaked on the Billboard charts at #7.

Track listing

Side one
 "Seventh Son" (Willie Dixon) – 2:45
 "Greenback Dollar" (Hoyt Axton, Kennard Ramsey) – 3:19
 "Stop! In the Name of Love" (Holland–Dozier–Holland) – 3:07
 "Un-Square Dance" (Rivers) – 0:45
 "Silver Threads and Golden Needles" (Jack Rhodes) – 2:59
 "Land of 1000 Dances" (Chris Kenner) – 5:49

Side two
 "Parchman Farm" (Mose Allison) – 3:41
 "I'll Cry Instead" (Lennon–McCartney) – 2:53
 "Break Up" (Charlie Rich) – 3:05
 "Work Song" (Nat Adderley) – 4:22
 "Stagger Lee" (Herb Wiedoeft) – 3:14
 "Susie Q" (Dale Hawkins) – 4:09

Personnel

Musicians
 Mickey Jones – drums
 Joe Osborn – bass guitar
 Johnny Rivers – vocals, electric guitar

Technical
 Lou Adler – producer, liner notes
 Wally Heider – remote engineer
 Bones Howe  - studio engineer
 Studio Five – cover

References

Johnny Rivers albums
Albums produced by Lou Adler
1965 live albums
Albums recorded at the Whisky a Go Go
Imperial Records live albums